This is a list of Kosovo national futsal team results from 2016 to 2019.

History

After membership in UEFA and FIFA
Kosovo for the first time after joining UEFA and FIFA participated in the Futsal Week Tournament in which it was declared champion after three victories (against Finland; 3–1, twice against Turkey; 7–0 and 3–0) and one loss (against Finland; 5–6). Kosovo, after being declared champions in the Futsal Week Tournament, played two friendlies with Macedonia, which they lost with the results 2–6 (first match), and 2–5 (second match).

Participations at qualifications

UEFA Futsal Euro 2018 qualifying
On 21 October 2016, in Nyon, it was decided that Kosovo should be part in Group E of the UEFA Futsal Euro 2018 qualifying, together with Cyprus, Denmark and Norway. On 30 January 2017, Kosovo made his debut on UEFA Futsal Euro qualifying with a 1–5 away win against Norway that was simultaneously also the first-ever competitive win.

2020 FIFA Futsal World Cup qualifications
On 12 December 2018, in Nyon, it was decided that Kosovo should be part in Group B of the 2020 FIFA Futsal World Cup qualification, together with Andorra, Belarus and Norway. On 30 January 2019, Kosovo made their debut on FIFA Futsal World Cup qualifications with a 5–0 away defeat against Belarus.

Fixtures and results

2016

2017

2018

2019

Kosovo versus other countries
Head-to-head records are included only matches as FIFA member.

References

External links
 
Kosovo (futsal) News about the team

national futsal team results